The 2000 Oklahoma Wranglers season is the sixth season for the franchise, and the first in Oklahoma City. The team played in the Arena Football League, and played the previous season in Portland, Oregon as the Portland Forest Dragons. The team was coached by Bob Cortese and played their home games at The Myriad in Oklahoma City. The Wranglers finished third in the American Conference West Division with a 7–7 record earned the 10 seed for the AFL playoffs. They lost in the quarterfinals to the San Jose SaberCats.

Schedule

Regular season

Playoffs

See also
2000 Arena Football League season

References

Oklahoma Wranglers
Oklahoma Wranglers seasons
Oklahoma W